Raheny Shamrock Athletic Club, founded in 1958, is an athletic club in Raheny, Dublin, Ireland, one of Ireland's oldest athletics clubs still operating and one of the most active. Raheny athletes compete in a wide range of events including every National Championship.

History
The club was founded by Paddy Boland, partly based on local traditional annual sports activities.

Honours
National Senior Cross Country Champions Men - 2016, 2017
National Senior Cross Country Champions Women - 1968, 1971, 2013
National Road Relay Champions Men - 2001, 2003, 2004, 2009, 2010, 2011, 2016, 2017
National Road Relay Champions Women - 1995, 2003, 2007, 2008, 2010

Key figures
The club has provided five Olympic athletes, with seven appearances: Dick Hooper (1980, 1984, 1988); Pat Hooper (1980); Paddy McGrath (2000); Mick Clohisey (2016); and Sophie Becker (2020).

Facilities
The club makes extensive use of quiet local roads but especially of Dublin city's second-largest municipal park, St. Anne's Park.  It had a modest clubhouse in the centre of Raheny, in a former schoolhouse on the banks of the Santry River, before securing the use of the former Catholic church, St Assam's. Plans exist for a long-term clubhouse on city-owned land near the Raheny National Schools complex and other sports club bases.

Colours
The club's colours are white and green. The Club's kit is a White Vest with an emerald Green Band across the chest with the word Raheny embedded. Shorts are emerald green.

Races
The Shamrocks promote 36 races a year, including:
Raheny 5 Mile Road Race - Last Sunday of January each year, a major national event, starting in Raheny Village and around St. Anne's Park
Mid-Summers 5K
Winter League Road Race Series - Held Between November and April, including Four 3 Mile Races, Four 2 Mile Races and Three 1 Mile Races
Raheny Mile - incorporates the final Round of the Winter League
The Holland Cup - 3 Mile Sealed Handicap Road Race
Lord Mayor Two Mile Series - 12 two mile (3 km) races held between June and August.
The Jim Wall Cup - Three Mile Open Handicap Road Race
Joe Noonan Cup - Six Mile and Three Mile Road Race
Christmas Day Mile - Held in association with GOAL
St.Stephens Day Parlaufs
Brian Boru 10 - 10 Mile road race which features the Leinster 10 Mile Championship
St. Annes 4x400m race through the woods.
Fit4Life Series - Six Two Mile Races aimed for people new and returning to the Sport
National Road Relays - Hosted in association with Athletics Ireland

References

Athletics clubs in Ireland
Raheny
Sports clubs established in 1958
Athletics in Dublin (city)